Corban Knight (born September 10, 1990) is a Canadian professional ice hockey forward currently playing for Avangard Omsk of the Kontinental Hockey League (KHL). He was a fifth-round selection, 135th overall, by the Florida Panthers in the 2009 NHL Entry Draft, but was traded to the Calgary Flames after the Panthers were unable to sign him to a contract. Knight played four seasons of college hockey with the University of North Dakota and was a finalist for the Hobey Baker Award in 2012–13.

Early life
Knight was born in Oliver, British Columbia and moved to High River, Alberta, at age 11. His parents are Jack and Laurie Knight. Jack Knight  is a Baptist minister and chaplain for the Calgary Flames and Calgary Stampeders.

Playing midget hockey with the Strathmore UFA Bisons, Knight led the Alberta Midget Hockey League in scoring in 2007–08 with 65 points. He was also named the most valuable player of the 2007 Mac's Midget AAA World Invitational Tournament after leading the event in scoring. A late developer physically, he was not drafted to play junior hockey in the Western Hockey League and opted to play Junior A with the Okotoks Oilers of the Alberta Junior Hockey League (AJHL). He played a handful of games with the Oilers in 2007–08, then won the league's Rookie of the Year award in 2008–09 after finishing eighth overall in AJHL scoring with 72 points, including 34 goals.

Playing career

College
The Florida Panthers selected Knight with their fifth-round selection, 135th overall, at the 2009 NHL Entry Draft. While he had expected to return to Okotoks for the 2009–10 season, he instead joined the University of North Dakota (UND) on a full scholarship after junior forward Matt Frattin was dismissed from the squad. Knight studied physical education, exercise science and wellness while attending UND.

In his freshman year, Knight finished second on the team in rookie scoring with 13 points and was twice named Western Collegiate Hockey Association (WCHA) rookie of the week. Knight and UND won their first of three consecutive Broadmoor Trophies as WCHA playoff champions. He finished second on the team and 10th in the WCHA with 40 points in his sophomore year, 2010–11, and set a school record for faceoff efficiency; he won 59.9 percent of his draws to surpass Zach Parise's mark of 59.1 percent in 2003–04.  Knight was named an assistant captain in his junior season of 2011–12, and finished with 40 points.  He won the Archie Krum Memorial Athletic Scholarship, given by the school to a player who "demonstrates leadership qualities, high academic standards and athletic excellence."

Completing his college eligibility in 2012–13, Knight recorded his third consecutive 40-point season as his 16 goals and 33 assists totalled a personal high of 49 points. He had a 19-game point streak, the longest for any UND player in 25 years.  Knight won the Jeff Anderson Scholarship Award as UND's most valuable player, was named to the National Collegiate Athletic Association West Region All-Tournament Team and was named to the second team at both the All-WCHA and All-American levels. He was also named a top-ten finalist for the Hobey Baker Award as top player in American college hockey; the award was ultimately won by Drew LeBlanc.

Professional
Upon graduation, the Panthers were required to sign Knight to a contract or risk losing his playing rights as he would become an unrestricted free agent. Unable to come to terms on a deal, Florida chose to trade him to the Calgary Flames in exchange for a fourth-round selection at the 2013 NHL Entry Draft. Knight began the 2013–14 season with Calgary's American Hockey League (AHL) affiliate, the Abbotsford Heat. He had 14 goals and 51 points in his first 53 games when a string of injuries in Calgary led to his recall on March 5, 2014. Knight made his NHL debut that night in a 4–1 win over the Ottawa Senators. He scored his first goal (and point) against goaltender Frederik Andersen in a 7–2 victory over the Anaheim Ducks on March 12, 2014.

During the 2014–15 season, while with AHL affiliate the Adirondack Flames, Knight was traded by the Flames in a return to his original club, the Florida Panthers, in exchange for Drew Shore on January 9, 2015.

Knight signed a one-year AHL contract with the Lehigh Valley Phantoms on September 1, 2016. In the 2016–17 season, he appeared in 72 games with the Phantoms where he recorded 11 goals and 29 assists for 40 points. On July 1, 2017, Knight was rewarded for his season by regaining an NHL contract in accepting a two-year, two-way deal with the Phantoms' NHL affiliate, the Philadelphia Flyers. Knight performed quite well in the 2017–18 season with the Phantoms tallying 14 goals and 23 assists appearing in just 58 games.

As a free agent from the Flyers, he left North America and signed a one-year contract with Barys Nur-Sultan of the KHL on May 28, 2019. He made an immediate impact with the Kazakh-based club, posting 20 goals and 40 points in 60 regular season games in the 2019–20 season. He added an assist during Barys' opening-round victory in the playoffs before the season was cancelled due to the COVID-19 pandemic.

As a free agent at the conclusion of his contract with Barys, Knight continued in the KHL, securing a lucrative two-year contract with Russian club Avangard Omsk on May 1, 2020.

International play
In January 2022, Knight was selected to play for Team Canada at the 2022 Winter Olympics.

Career statistics

Regular season and playoffs

International

Awards and honours

References

External links
 

1990 births
Living people
Abbotsford Heat players
Adirondack Flames players
Avangard Omsk players
Barys Nur-Sultan players
Calgary Flames players
Canadian ice hockey centres
Florida Panthers draft picks
Florida Panthers players
Ice hockey people from Alberta
Ice hockey people from British Columbia
Lehigh Valley Phantoms players
North Dakota Fighting Hawks men's ice hockey players
Okotoks Oilers players
People from High River
People from Oliver, British Columbia
Philadelphia Flyers players
Portland Pirates players
San Antonio Rampage players
AHCA Division I men's ice hockey All-Americans
Ice hockey players at the 2022 Winter Olympics
Olympic ice hockey players of Canada